The 1910–11 season was the 17th in the history of Southern Football League. Swindon Town won Division One for the first time and Reading finished top of the Division Two. Reading returned to Division One after previous season relegation along with Stoke.

No Southern League clubs applied for election to the Football League this season.

Division One

There were no new clubs in Division One this season.

Division Two

A total of twelve teams contest the division, including 7 sides from previous season Division Two A and Division Two B, two teams relegated from Division One and three new teams.

Teams relegated from 1909–10 Division One:
 Croydon Common
 Reading
Newly elected teams:
 Cardiff City
 Treharris
 Walsall

References

1910-11
1910–11 in English association football leagues
1910–11 in Welsh football